Joseph Michael McDade (September 29, 1931 – September 24, 2017) was an American politician who was a member of the United States House of Representatives, having represented Pennsylvania's 10th congressional district.

Early life and career

McDade was born in Scranton, Pennsylvania. He graduated from the University of Notre Dame in 1953, and earned his LL.B. from the University of Pennsylvania. McDade served a clerkship in the office of John W. Murphy, chief federal judge for the Middle District of Pennsylvania. He opened his own law practice in 1957. McDade was elected Scranton City Solicitor in 1962.

However, just after taking office as city solicitor, he was elected to Congress as a Republican.  He barely held onto his seat in 1964 amid Lyndon B. Johnson's gigantic landslide that year, winning by just over 2,800 votes over James Haggerty.  However, he would never face another contest nearly that close, and even ran unopposed in 1990.

In 1966, along with seven other Republican members of Congress, McDade signed a telegram sent to Georgia Governor Carl E. Sanders regarding the Georgia General Assembly's refusal to seat the recently elected Julian Bond in their state House of Representatives. This refusal, said the telegram, was "a dangerous attack on representative government. None of us agree with Mr. Bond's views on the Vietnam War; in fact we strongly repudiate these views. But unless otherwise determined by a court of law, which the Georgia Legislature is not, he is entitled to express them."

McDade was a longtime member of the House Appropriations Committee.  After the Republicans gained control of the House in 1994, he served as vice-chairman of the full committee, chairman of the Subcommittee on Energy and Water Development and vice chairman of the Appropriations Subcommittee on National Security.

Unlike most Republicans, McDade had strong ties to organized labor. This served him well, since 60% of the 10th's vote was cast in the heavily Democratic and thoroughly unionized city of Scranton.

McDade was conservative on social issues. He was a member of the National Rifle Association and cosponsored several bills attempting to ban abortion and flag burning. He was also a strong supporter of tax and welfare reform, but also was an opponent of free trade agreements.

Regionally, McDade was the principal advocate for the Tobyhanna Army Depot and was instrumental in establishing the Delaware Water Gap National Recreation Area, the Steamtown National Historic Site, and the National Fishery Laboratory in Wellsboro. The government acquisition of Steamtown, U.S.A. and spending on the National Historic Site was criticized as pork barrel spending.

McDade retired from the House in 1999. He suffered from Parkinson's disease.

Indictment, acquittal and the "McDade Amendment"
In 1992, McDade was indicted on bribery charges. He was charged with racketeering and conspiracy after allegedly accepting gifts and trips in exchange for allegedly diverting government contracts to specific groups. He was acquitted after a jury trial in 1996. Nevertheless, the indictment resulted in him being passed over for the chairmanship of the Appropriations Committee in 1995, even though he was the committee's most senior member. The chairmanship instead went to Bob Livingston of Louisiana, who was first elected to the House in 1977.

Following his acquittal, Congressman McDade sought to restrict the DOJ's attempts to set its own standards for ex parte contacts of represented persons and parties. He also objected to DoJ's view that its attorneys should be exempt from the ex parte contact rules of the states in which they are licensed and in which they practice. See generally Charles A. Weiss, Lawyers Bypassing Lawyers, 28 Litigation, Winter 2002, at 42.

McDade was successful in his efforts to ensure DOJ attorneys adhere to state bar ethics standards. The text of the statutory change he authored, commonly referred to as the "McDade Amendment," is as follows:

(a) An attorney for the Government shall be subject to State laws and rules, and local Federal court rules, governing attorneys in each State where such attorney engages in that attorney's duties, to the same extent and in the same manner as other attorneys in that State.
(b) The Attorney General shall make and amend rules of the Department of Justice to assure compliance with this section.
(c) As used in this section, the term "attorney for the Government" includes any attorney described in section 77.2(a) of part 77 of title 28 of the Code of Federal Regulations and also includes any independent counsel, or employee of such a counsel, appointed under chapter 40.

For the codified text of this law see 28 U.S.C. § 530B (2000). To see the implementing regulations, see 28 C.F.R. § 77.2 (2006).

The McDade Amendment principally applies to DOJ lawyers but is also applicable to attorneys from other federal government departments and agencies working with the DOJ. See Memorandum for Command Counsels, Office of Command Counsel Newsletter (U.S. Army Material Command, Office of the Command Counsel, Ft. Belvoir, Va.), Dec. 1999, at 52–53.

Death
McDade died on September 24, 2017 in Fairfax, Virginia.

Places named for McDade
 McDade Park – The Lackawanna Valley was scarred by coal mine surface "strippings", and one such surface mine was the Old Continental in the Keyser Valley. Congressman McDade secured funding and support to reclaim the Old Continental strip mine and convert it to a recreational park. The park has served as an environmental laboratory to learn more about how such reclamation work could be done. In 1978, McDade Park was dedicated and became the flagship of the Lackawana County's park system.
 McDade Airport Terminal – In 2006 the Wilkes-Barre/Scranton International Airport Terminal building was named in honor of Congressman McDade. Congressman McDade's father played a key role in helping the Airport open. specifically, in 1941, John B. McDade, the congressman's father and president of the Heidelberg Coal Co., donated  (0.49 km2) on which part of the Airport now sits. John B. McDade donated this land to "help the national defense in time of war." Thanks to land donated by John McDade, and purchased from others, the Wilkes-Barre/Scranton Airport opened June 1, 1947. In the 1990s the Airport infrastructure needed updating. Congressman McDade secured federal budgets and grants to accomplish this task.
University of Scranton McDade Center for Literary and Performing Arts – The University of Scranton honored Congressman McDade by naming its Center for Literary and Performing Arts after him and by creating the McDade Center for Technology Transfer.
 McDade Trail

References

 The Political Graveyard
  Voting Record from the Library of Congress

External links
 
 Photo of Congressman Joseph McDade 
 

|-

1931 births
2017 deaths
20th-century American lawyers
20th-century American politicians
Pennsylvania lawyers
People acquitted of corruption
People from Clarks Summit, Pennsylvania
People with Parkinson's disease
Politicians from Scranton, Pennsylvania
University of Notre Dame alumni
University of Pennsylvania Law School alumni
Republican Party members of the United States House of Representatives from Pennsylvania
Members of Congress who became lobbyists